See:
Ice hockey in Canada
Ice hockey in Mexico
Ice hockey in the United States
:Category:Ice hockey in North America by country